The British Amateur Press Association was an amateur press association created by comics fans in late 1977, following a proposal from Phil Greenaway in the letter pages of the comics fanzine BEM; the first mailing (under the name PAPA, the first initial standing for "Prime") was circulated in January 1978. Greenaway was the first Central Mailer and his successors included Maureen "Mo" James, Howard Stangroom, Les Chester, and Steve Green. For most of its existence, up to thirty members of BAPA submitted multiple copies of at least two A4 pages to the central mailer every two months. BAPA was disbanded on 17 August 2004, with a final mailing distributed early in 2005. A one-off publication was also distributed under the name B-APA (sic) in 2005, in memory of Andy Roberts; a similar publication was announced in 2008, in memory of Steve Whitaker.

Notable members of this association included Eddie Campbell, Mark Finch, John Freeman, Steve Green, artist Nigel Kitching, Martin Lock, Andy Roberts, Martin Skidmore (later publisher of Fantasy Advertiser and then editor of Trident Comics), and artist Steve Whitaker.

See also
List of companies based in London

References

Comics magazines published in the United Kingdom
Comics-related organizations
Comics publications
1977 establishments in the United Kingdom
Organizations established in 1977
Communications and media organisations based in the United Kingdom